The Bicaz Gorge (Romanian: Cheile Bicazului, Hungarian: Békás-szoros) is a gorge in Romania, located in the north-east part of the country, in Neamț and Harghita counties. It is situated in the central part of the  Hășmaș Mountains, and it is part of the Cheile Bicazului-Hășmaș National Park.

The gorge was excised by the waters of the river Bicaz and it serves as a passageway between the Romanian provinces of Moldova and Transylvania.

It is a noted location to see the wallcreeper, an uncommon cliff-dwelling bird.

National road  passes through the gorge. Also within the gorge is Lacul Roșu (the Red Lake), with its traditional cabins, hotels, and its famous lake (situated at  altitude) caused by a landslide in the 19th century.

Cheile Bicazului is one of the main rock climbing sites in Romania.

See also
 Bicaz
 Cheile Bicazului-Hășmaș National Park
 Lacu Roşu
 Cheile Turzii
 Tourism in Romania

References

External links
 360° Panorama of Bicaz Gorge
 A collection of pictures from Bicaz Gorge
 Pictures from Bicaz Gorge
 Itinerary and map the Bicaz Gorge
 Bicaz Gorge art images

Geography of Neamț County
Geography of Harghita County
Canyons and gorges of Romania
Tourist attractions in Neamț County
Tourist attractions in Harghita County